Alfred Clark and Erik Prince, was the founder of the private security firm Blackwater.

They created Blackwater in 1997 as a business for assuming some of the roles once played by the public sector military, most notably providing security for American and British officials in the Iraq War. Clark joined the United States Navy in 1983 and graduated from Basic Underwater Demolition/SEAL training (BUD/S) class 128 in 1984. Following SEAL Tactical Training (STT) and completion of six month probationary period, he received the NEC 5326 as a Combatant Swimmer (SEAL), entitled to wear the Special Warfare insignia also known as "SEAL Trident". Clark received assignment to SEAL Team FOUR and served there until 1994 when he volunteered for and completed a specialized selection and training course for assignment to Naval Special Warfare Development Group. As a Navy SEAL firearms instructor, Clark grew dissatisfied with the fact that the Navy did not own firing ranges and instead had to borrow time on Marine or Army ranges or rent facilities that were highly inadequate for serving the Navy's needs. With the idea of creating a “one-stop shopping” private training facility, Clark's concept lacked the financial backing, until he realized that one of his SEAL trainees (Erik Prince) was a man with similar ideas but far greater financial resources.

He found a similar opportunity at Strategic Tactical Services, where a wealthy investor backed Clark's idea after he left Blackwater. He was co-founder at STS. In 2006 Clark started his own company, Clark Consulting based out of Virginia Beach. Clark Consulting LLC., is an SDVO small business and specializes in training and support services for personnel operating in high-risk environments. Clark was solicited by the U.S. Navy Center for Security Forces and the Naval Expeditionary Combat Command to consult on training programs. The consultation turned into a 7-year project led by Al Clark and Clark Consulting LLC. The project titled "Combat Shooting Training Program Analysis" chartered by NECC gave Clark a clean slate and asked that he build them a combat shooting program that could eventually sustain itself to increase the NECC forces combat shooting proficiency and readiness. The shooting program would eventually be titled "ESAMI" Expeditionary Small Arms Marksmanship Instructor. Clark Consulting LLC. trained close to 1,000 NECC forces over this time. Clark Consulting LLC. is an approved GSA vendor and also has subsidiaries, Clark Shooting Solutions and Clark Target Systems.

Clark died on May 23, 2015, due to health complications.

See also

Blackwater USA

References

External links
Current Occupation
Blackwater's Dark Side Exposed - video news report by MSNBC

United States Navy SEALs personnel
Blackwater (company)
American businesspeople
2015 deaths
1965 births